Trevor Stewart (15 March 1940 – 20 May 2020) was an Australian cricketer. He played in six first-class matches for Queensland between 1960 and 1964.

References

External links
 

1940 births
2020 deaths
Australian cricketers
Queensland cricketers
Place of birth missing